Mary Adelaide Virginia Thomasina Eupatoria "Patsy" Cornwallis-West (née FitzPatrick; The Vale, Bailieborough 28 October 1854 – 21 July 1920) was an Irish-born aristocrat and a prominent mistress of the future King Edward VII.

Early life
Cornwallis-West was born into an upper-class Irish family as the daughter of the Rev. Frederick, a descendant of Barnaby Fitzpatrick, 1st Baron Upper Ossory, and Lady Olivia FitzPatrick, daughter of Thomas Taylour, 2nd Marquess of Headfort.

Personal life

Her mother unsuccessfully attempted to seduce Albert, Prince Consort, and Cornwallis-West herself became mistress of the Prince of Wales (later King Edward VII) at the age of 16. The affair was discovered, and in 1872 she was married to the Lord-Lieutenant of Denbighshire William Cornwallis-West. He was more than twice her age and from 1885 to 1892 served as a MP for Denbighshire West. They lived at Ruthin Castle and had three children:

 Mary Theresa Olivia "Daisy" Cornwallis-West (1873–1943), who married Prince Hans Heinrich XV von Hochberg.
 George Cornwallis-West (1874–1951), who married the American heiress, Jennie Jerome in 1900. She was the former wife of Lord Randolph Churchill and the mother of future Prime Minister of the United Kingdom, Winston Churchill, of whom George was just 16 days older than. They too divorced in 1914 and he married the stage actress Mrs Patrick Campbell the same year.
 Constance Cornwallis-West (1875–1970), who married Hugh Grosvenor, 2nd Duke of Westminster in 1901. They divorced in 1919 and she married John Fitzpatrick Lewis.

Cornwallis-West became notorious for using her influence over the Prince of Wales to arrange marriages for her children, particularly the marriage of her younger daughter to the wealthy Duke of Westminster.

In 1915, she began a relationship with a much younger shell-shocked soldier, Patrick Barrett, nursed in the Duchess of Westminster's hospital in Le Touquet. Her attempts to have the soldier promoted within the army caused a scandal. She was widowed in 1917 and died of stomach cancer three years later.

In popular culture
She was portrayed by actress Jennie Linden in the 1978 London Weekend miniseries Lillie based on the life of her friend Lillie Langtry, who was another lover of Edward VII.

See also
Famous courtesans in history

References

Tim Coates, Patsy: The Story of Mary Cornwallis-West (Bloomsbury, 2003)

1858 births
1920 deaths
British socialites
Mistresses of Edward VII
Women of the Victorian era
Patsy
Date of birth unknown
Place of death unknown
FitzPatrick dynasty